Martin Kohlstedt (born 1988) is a German composer, movie soundtrack composer, pianist, and record producer with a contemporary approach of mixing classical and avantgarde music styles.

Solo works 
Martin Kohlstedt studied media art at the Bauhaus University Weimar, was trained in jazz piano and produced electronic dance music before focussing on his solo works. He initially released two corresponding solo piano albums: 'Tag' (2012) & 'Nacht' (2014). In 2017, a third record followed, called 'Strom', which also features electronic instrumentation. 2020 saw his fourth solo release called 'Flur'. 

In a live setting Kohlstedt mostly uses grand and upright pianos in combination with a Fender Rhodes and several synthesizers. The Daily Telegraph said in review of his London live debut that "the music’s repetitive patterns and modal harmonies sometimes reminded one of other music often described as hypnotic, from Ryuichi Sakamoto to Einaudi. What sets Kohlstedt apart is the undercurrent of anxiety, and the occasional moments of grandeur".

He frequently plays concerts at international festivals and concert halls, such as the Russian State Library in Moscow, where he also played a television concert for the Russian TV station Дождь, or the Talar-e Rudaki in Teheran. In December 2017, Kohlstedt played a sold-out show in the main hall of the newly built Elbphilharmonie in Hamburg. He also plays contemporary pop and electronic music festivals like SXSW Festival.

Modular compositions 

Kohlstedts approach to modular composing, in which a cohesive 'piece' does not exist but is rather always changing, was laid out by him in a 2017 TEDx-Talk. He also demonstrated the principle with the release of a single called 'OMBLEH',  which is derived from the corresponding modules 'OMB' and 'LEH' from two different albums. (Another example live at the Elbphilharmonie )

According to Kohlstedt, pieces - or modules - serve as a base vocabulary that can be combined and put into different contexts, like other instrumentations, connotations or tempi. His first two records 'Tag' and 'Nacht' are a collection of such modules, as is the 2020 record 'Flur' which serves as “new vocabulary and a fertile ground to build something anew”.

The production of these core records is often very close and intimate to underscore the context and point of time of the recording. The "inner mechanics of the instrument itself" can often be heard and field recordings too: "You can hear the rain falling on his roof (AJA), birds singing on front of the flat (LUN), and sometimes it feels like there is a little breeze coming up."

An acclaimed example of the improvisation and reworking of modules through context was the 'Ströme' project, commissioned by the classical concert hall Gewandhaus, Leipzig. Here a full choir had to coordinate with Kohlstedts' dynamic play and the pianist himself had to react to the interpretations of the 70 singers and their conductor. Kohlstedts foundational compositions were treated as "recombinant parts of connected musical ideas".

In 2017, the German newspaper Die Zeit published the first part of a filmed documentation about his work followed by the second part.

Collaborations 
Next to his solo albums Martin Kohlstedt released several collaborations: 2013 saw the remix album "Tag Remixes" and 2015 the so-called "Nacht Reworks", which are close collaborations with Pop- and electronic artists like FM Belfast, Christian Löffler and Douglas Dare. He also did an improvised live session in 2017 with Peter Broderick.

After 2017 saw the release 'Strom', which no longer contained purely acoustic piano pieces but multi-layered compositions with piano and electronic components, another major collaboration used this set of modules: The full 70 people choir of the Leipzig Gewandhaus Orchestra and its musical director Gregor Meyer performed several public working sessions, during which Kohlstedt's modular play merged with the vocal corpus of the choir into "one completely new instrument". The performance stayed somewhat flexible, with Meyer steering the choir close to Kohlstedts improvisations and vice versa. In 2019, they recorded a version of that performance at the Gewandhaus Leipzig and released it as the album "Ströme". The compositional modules it featured were both new and from the previous albums brought together. The choir and Martin Kohlstedt also went on tour with this performance that year.

In 2020 several reworks of 'Ströme' were released as the digital 'RECURRENTS', reshaping the already morphed compositions. Among the collaborators were Sudan Archives, Robag Wruhme (one of the Wighnomy Brothers), Henrik Schwarz, and Hannah Epperson.

Musical & sound installations 
 In 2017, Martin Kohlstedt created a visual-acoustic performance called "Currents" in collaboration with Reeperbahn Festival and the design groups 'Bloodbrothers' and 'Elektropastete'. In "Currents" generatively generated visualizations were projected in a specially built 360° dome. Kohlstedt played live in this dome and his play responded actively to the visuals.

 Martin Kohlstedt composed the score for a 'fireworks musical' commissioned by the 'Feria Nacional de la Pirotecnia' fireworks festival in Tultepec, Mexico, the largest of its kind in Latin America.

 In 2019 Kohlstedt composed an interactive sound installation titled "KIUMAKO" for the Burning Man Festival, Nevada, in collaboration with 'Kunst-Technik-Einheit'. Several algorithms work together and generate different dramaturgies, melodies, bars and instrumentation under the influence of the visitors and their behavior.

Discography

Solo albums 
 2012: Tag 
 2014: Nacht 
 2015: Nacht Reworks 
 2017: Strom
 2019: Ströme 
 2020: FLUR

Singles & EPs 
 2013: Tag Remixes (EP - Edition Kohlstedt)
 2017: OMBLEH (Single - Edition Kohlstedt)
 2020: JINGOL (Henrik Schwarz Recurrent) (Single - Warner Classics)
 2020: THIPHY (Peter Broderick Reimagining) (Single - Warner Classics)
 2020: SENIMB (Robag Wruhme Marowk Rehand) (Single - Warner Classics)
 2020: KSYCHA (ÄTNA Who Are You Rework) (Single - Warner Classics)
 2020: AMSOMB (Marlow Re-Mood) (Single - Warner Classics)
 2020: TARLEH (Hannah Epperson Recurrent) (Single - Warner Classics)
 2020: NIODOM (Panthera Krause Recurrent) (Single - Warner Classics)
 2020: AUHEJA (Sudan Archives Recurrent) (Single - Warner Classics)

Movie scores & soundtracks 
 2010: Margot (Clemens Beier)
 2011: Lo Vedo (Rafael Vogel)
 2011: Ausgeträumt (Konstantin Egerndorfer)
 2015: Hexenmilch (Martin Jehle)
 2016: Anna (Martin Jehle)
 2016: Farewell Halong (No Fairway to Halong Bay) (Duc Ngo Ngoc)
 2016: Ein Haufen Liebe (Alina Cyranek)
 2017: Monju Hunters of Sofugan Island (Karim Eich and Dirk Wachsmuth)
 2018: Das Leben in mir (Konstantin Egerndorfer)
 2018: MOJSŁOŃIK - My Little Elephant (Silke Meya)
 2019: Uferfrauen – Lesbisches L(i)eben in der DDR (Barbara Wallbraun)
 2020: The Man with the Camera (B.K. Wunder)
 2020: Grace (Konstantin Egerndorfer)

Environmentalism 
In 2019 Kohlstedt bought 1.2 hectare of land in the Thuringian Forest to reforest it. Over 100 volunteers helped this project which is financed by concert ticket sales. In the first phase 10.000 trees are to be planted. The project is an effort to integrate actions on climate change into the music industry.

References

External links 

 Official website
 Discography on Discogs
 

Living people
1988 births
German pianists
German composers
German classical composers
German male classical composers
Neoclassical composers
German male pianists
21st-century pianists
20th-century German male musicians
21st-century German male musicians
20th-century German musicians